Roești is a commune located in Vâlcea County, Oltenia, Romania. It is composed of ten villages: Băiașa, Băjenari, Bărbărigeni, Ciocâltei, Cueni, Frasina, Piscu Scoarței, Roești, Râpa Cărămizii, and Saioci.

Natives
 Dem. Theodorescu

References

Communes in Vâlcea County
Localities in Oltenia